Olga Andreyeva Carlisle (born 22 January 1930) is a French-born American novelist, translator, and painter. Carlisle, with her husband Henry Carlisle, is notable for translating Alexander Solzhenitsyn's work into English. Although Solzhenitsyn criticized the translations, Carlisle felt they helped bring his work to a wider audience and contributed to Solzhenitsyn's Nobel Prize.

Biography

Carlisle was born in Paris to a Russian literary family. Her father, Vadim Andreyev, was the son of Russian writer Leonid Andreyev. Her mother, Olga Chernova-Andreyeva, was the stepdaughter of Viktor Chernov, a Russian revolutionary and one of the founders of the Russian Socialist-Revolutionary Party.

Carlisle attended Bard College in New York from 1949-1953. She met her husband Henry Carlisle during this time and they moved to New York City in 1953. She now lives in San Francisco.

As an artist, Carlisle's paintings have been shown in Paris and across the United States. She was mentored by Louis Schanker in the 1940s; then Earl Loran and Robert Motherwell in the 1950s.

Works
 Voices in the Snow (1962)
 Poets on Street Corners (1968)
 Solzhenitsyn and the Secret Circle (1978)
 Under a New Sky (1993)
 The Idealists (1999) (with Henry Carlisle)
 Far from Russia (2000)

Translations
 The First Circle by Aleksandr Solzhenitsyn (with Henry Carlisle)
 The Gulag Archipelago by Aleksandr Solzhenitsyn (with Henry Carlisle)
 The Idiot by Fyodor Dostoevsky (1978, with Henry Carlisle)

References 

American women novelists
Bard College alumni
1930 births
American translators
Russian–English translators
20th-century American novelists
American women painters
Living people
Writers from Paris
French emigrants to the United States
20th-century American painters
21st-century American women artists
21st-century American painters
20th-century American women artists
21st-century American women writers
20th-century American women writers
21st-century American novelists
Writers from San Francisco
Writers from New York City
French people of Russian descent